Urupe is a genus of fungi within the Meliolaceae family. This is a monotypic genus, containing the single species Urupe guaduae.

References

External links

Taxa described in 1944
Meliolaceae
Monotypic Sordariomycetes genera